Ivo Klec and Andreas Siljeström won the title, defeating Konstantin Kravchuk and Denys Molchanov 6–3, 6–2 in the final.

Seeds

Draw

Draw

References
 Main Draw

Siberia Cup - Doubles
2012 Doubles
Siberia